Scinax dolloi, or Werner's Brazilian tree frog, is a frog in the family Hylidae.  It is endemic to Brazil.  Scientists know it exclusively from its type locality in the Mantiqueira Range.

References

dolloi
Frogs of South America